Phobolosia anfracta is a species of moth in the family Erebidae first described by Henry Edwards in 1881. It is found in North America.

The MONA or Hodges number for Phobolosia anfracta is 8439.

References

Further reading

External links
 Original description: Edwards, Henry (1881). "Descriptions of Two New Species of Lithosidae". Papilio. 1 (1): 12.

Scolecocampinae
Articles created by Qbugbot
Moths described in 1881